Essam Awad (born 24 August 1962) is an Egyptian volleyball player. He competed in the men's tournament at the 1984 Summer Olympics.

References

1962 births
Living people
Egyptian men's volleyball players
Olympic volleyball players of Egypt
Volleyball players at the 1984 Summer Olympics
Place of birth missing (living people)